Anton Ivanovich Lopatin (January 18, 1897 – April 9, 1965) was a Soviet officer during the Second World War,  and Hero of the Soviet Union.

Lopatin begun his service in the Red Army in 1918, and participated in the Russian Civil War. After completing his command courses in 1927.

From 1937 Lopatin was appointed commander of a cavalry division. He began the Great Patriotic War in the rank of General-Major, and was promoted to the rank of General-Lieutenant 1942.

During the war he commanded the 31st Rifle Corps of the Southwestern Front (from October 1940), 9th Army (from July 1941), 37th Army (October 1941 – June 1942), 62nd Army (from August 1942) with the mission, to defend Stalingrad, 34th Army (from October 1942), 11th Army (during March - July 1943), and 20th Army (September - October 1943).

During January - July 1944 Lopatin served as the Deputy Commander of the 43rd Army, and from July 1944 as Commanding Officer of the 13th Guards Corps with the 1st Baltic and 3rd Belorussian Fronts.

He also completed the Higher academic course at the Military Academy of the General Staff in 1947.

After the war Lopatin commanded a Rifle Corps, and occupied high-ranking positions in Staffs of several Military Districts before retiring in 1954.

Honours and awards
Anton Lopatin was awarded three Orders of Lenin, two Orders of the Red Banner, two Orders of Kutuzov (1st class), Order of the Red Star, and numerous medals.

Sources 
ЛОПАТИН Антон Иванович

1897 births
1965 deaths
People from Brest District
Soviet military personnel of World War II
Soviet lieutenant generals
Heroes of the Soviet Union
Recipients of the Order of Lenin
Recipients of the Order of the Red Banner
Recipients of the Order of Kutuzov, 1st class